Celebrity Reflection is the fifth, final, and largest , her sister ships being Celebrity Equinox, Celebrity Eclipse, Celebrity Solstice and Celebrity Silhouette. Solstice, Equinox, Eclipse and Silhouette entered service in 2008, 2009, 2010, and 2011 respectively.  Reflection was launched in 2012.

Since October 2012, it has been owned and operated by Celebrity Cruises. It has one more deck than other s. The ship can accommodate over 3,609 passengers, more than any other Celebrity cruise ship.

Celebrity Reflection last dry dock was in October 2022. This refurbishing included regular maintenance, a general refresh and the change to the new dark blue color scheme of Celebrity first showcased on Celebrity Edge.

References

External links 
 

2012 ships
Reflection
Ships built in Papenburg